This is a list of 432 species in Cassida, a genus of tortoise beetles in the family Chrysomelidae.

Cassida species

 Cassida abamita Spaeth, 1916
 Cassida achardi Spaeth, 1926
 Cassida acutangula Borowiec, 1999
 Cassida aethiopica Boheman, 1854
 Cassida agilis Spaeth, 1915
 Cassida albertisi (Spaeth, 1903)
 Cassida algirica Lucas, 1849
 Cassida alpina Bremi-Wolf, 1855
 Cassida alticola Chen & Zia, 1984
 Cassida altiuscula Spaeth, 1916
 Cassida amaranthica Medvedev & Eroshkina, 1988
 Cassida ambrica Borowiec, 1999
 Cassida amorifica Boheman, 1862
 Cassida amurensis (Kraatz, 1879)
 Cassida ancorifera Boheman, 1856
 Cassida andapaensis Borowiec, 1988
 Cassida andreinii Spaeth, 1933
 Cassida andrewesi Weise, 1897
 Cassida angusta Marseul, 1876
 Cassida angustifrons Weise, 1891
 Cassida antoni Borowiec & Swietojanska, 1997
 Cassida appluda Spaeth, 1926
 Cassida astrolabiana (Spaeth, 1903)
 Cassida atrata Fabricius, 1787
 Cassida atrofemorata Borowiec & Sassi, 2002
 Cassida atrorubra Borowiec, 1999
 Cassida atrosignata Sekerka & Borowiec, 2008
 Cassida aureola (Spaeth, 1915)
 Cassida auropustulata (Fairmaire, 1899)
 Cassida aurora Weise, 1907
 Cassida australica (Boheman, 1855)
 Cassida avia (Weise, 1897)
 Cassida azurea Fabricius, 1801
 Cassida bakeri Spaeth, 1925
 Cassida basicollis (Chen & Zia, 1964)
 Cassida basilana Spaeth, 1925
 Cassida bella Falderman, 1837
 Cassida belli Weise, 1897
 Cassida belliformis Maulik, 1919
 Cassida benguelica Spaeth, 1933
 Cassida beniowskii Borowiec, 1988
 Cassida bergeali Bordy, 1995
 Cassida berolinensis Suffrian, 1844
 Cassida bezdeki Borowiec, 2002
 Cassida bicallosa Spaeth, 1915
 Cassida biguttata (Spaeth, 1903)
 Cassida binorbis (Chen & Zia, 1961)
 Cassida blanda Spaeth, 1933
 Cassida brevis Weise, 1884
 Cassida brooksi Borowiec, 1992
 Cassida butterwecki Borowiec, 2007
 Cassida callosicollis Spaeth, 1926
 Cassida calvaria (Weise, 1900)
 Cassida camerunensis (Spaeth, 1903)
 Cassida canaliculata Laicharting, 1781
 Cassida capensis Borowiec, 2005
 Cassida catenata (Boheman, 1855)
 Cassida ceylonica (Boheman, 1855)
 Cassida chapuisi Spaeth, 1912
 Cassida cherenica Spaeth, 1917
 Cassida cherrapunjiensis Maulik, 1919
 Cassida chiangmaiensis Borowiec, 2001
 Cassida chrysanthemoides Borowiec & Swietojanska, 2001
 Cassida circassica Medvedev, 1962
 Cassida circumdata Herbst, 1799
 Cassida circumflexa Spaeth, 1926
 Cassida circumsepta Spaeth, 1915
 Cassida coagulata Boheman, 1854
 Cassida coelebs Borowiec, 1999
 Cassida cognobilis Spaeth, 1926
 Cassida collucens Spaeth, 1915
 Cassida compuncta (Boheman, 1855)
 Cassida concallescens Spaeth, 1915
 Cassida concha Solsky, 1872
 Cassida conchyliata (Spaeth, 1914)
 Cassida consobrina Spaeth, 1915
 Cassida conspurcata Boheman, 1854
 Cassida corallina Boheman, 1862
 Cassida corbetti (Weise, 1897)
 Cassida cordula Boheman, 1854
 Cassida corollata Spaeth, 1940
 Cassida corruptrix Spaeth, 1914
 Cassida cristobalensis (Spaeth, 1936)
 Cassida crucifera (Kraatz, 1879)
 Cassida culminis (Chen & Zia, 1964)
 Cassida currax Spaeth, 1915
 Cassida deflorata Suffrian, 1844
 Cassida dehradunensis Borowiec & Takizawa, 1991
 Cassida delenifica Boheman, 1862
 Cassida delesserti Boheman, 1854
 Cassida deltoides Weise, 1889
 Cassida dembickyi Borowiec, 2001
 Cassida denticollis Suffrian, 1844
 Cassida denticulata Boheman, 1856
 Cassida depicta Boheman, 1862
 Cassida derasa Spaeth, 1940
 Cassida desultrix (Spaeth, 1940)
 Cassida devalaensis Borowiec & Takizawa, 1991
 Cassida devylderi Spaeth, 1928
 Cassida diomma Boisduval, 1835
 Cassida diops (Chen & Zia, 1964)
 Cassida discalis Gressitt, 1938
 Cassida distinguenda Spaeth, 1928
 Cassida dohertyi Spaeth, 1926
 Cassida dolens Borowiec, 1999
 Cassida dorsalis (Boheman, 1855)
 Cassida dorsonotata Boheman, 1854
 Cassida dorsovittata Boheman, 1854
 Cassida drakensbergensis Borowiec, 2005
 Cassida dulcis (Boheman, 1862)
 Cassida ellipticollis Spaeth, 1914
 Cassida elongata Weise, 1893
 Cassida eluta Boheman, 1862
 Cassida enervis Boheman, 1862
 Cassida eoa (Spaeth, 1928)
 Cassida excaecata Spaeth, 1933
 Cassida exilis Boheman, 1854
 Cassida eximia Borowiec & Ghate, 2004
 Cassida expansa Gressitt, 1952
 Cassida expressa (Spaeth, 1914)
 Cassida fausti Spaeth & Reitter, 1926
 Cassida feae Spaeth, 1904
 Cassida ferranti Spaeth, 1915
 Cassida ferruginea Goeze, 1777
 Cassida flaveola Thunberg, 1794  (pale tortoise beetle)
 Cassida flavoguttata Spaeth, 1914
 Cassida flavoscutata Spaeth, 1914
 Cassida flavosignata Spaeth, 1932
 Cassida foveolatipennis Borowiec & Swietojanska, 2001
 Cassida franklinmuelleri Spaeth, 1925
 Cassida frontalis Boheman, 1856
 Cassida fukhanica Medvedev & Eroshkina, 1988
 Cassida fumida Spaeth, 1914
 Cassida fuscomacula Borowiec, 1988
 Cassida fuscorufa Motschulsky, 1866
 Cassida fuscosignata Boheman, 1854
 Cassida fuscosparsa Boheman, 1854
 Cassida gansuica Chen & Zia, 1964
 Cassida gentilis Spaeth, 1926
 Cassida ghesquieri Spaeth, 1943
 Cassida gilva Weise, 1901
 Cassida ginpinica (Chen & Zia, 1961)
 Cassida glabella Boheman, 1854
 Cassida glebicolor Spaeth, 1926
 Cassida goudoti (Boheman, 1855)
 Cassida granula Boheman, 1856
 Cassida granulicollis Spaeth, 1905
 Cassida guttipennis Boheman, 1862
 Cassida hablitziae Motschulsky, 1838
 Cassida hainanensis Yu, 2002
 Cassida hemisphaerica Herbst, 1799
 Cassida hexastigma Suffrian, 1844
 Cassida hova (Weise, 1910)
 Cassida hovacassiformis Borowiec, 1999
 Cassida humeralis Kraatz, 1874
 Cassida humerosa Spaeth, 1902
 Cassida hyalina Weise, 1891
 Cassida icterica Boheman, 1854
 Cassida ictericiformis Borowiec, 2009
 Cassida imbecilla (Boheman, 1862)
 Cassida imitatrix Spaeth, 1916
 Cassida immaculicollis (Chen & Zia, 1961)
 Cassida imparata Gressitt & Kimoto, 1963
 Cassida impompalis Spaeth, 1924
 Cassida inaequalis Thomson, 1858
 Cassida incallida Spaeth, 1938
 Cassida inciens Spaeth, 1926
 Cassida inconstans (Fairmaire, 1899)
 Cassida indochinensis (Spaeth, 1919)
 Cassida inflaccens Spaeth, 1940
 Cassida inflata Gressitt, 1952
 Cassida informis Boheman, 1862
 Cassida innotata Boheman, 1854
 Cassida inopinata Sassi & Borowiec, 2006
 Cassida inquinata Brullé, 1832
 Cassida insulana Gressitt, 1952
 Cassida irregularis Boheman, 1854
 Cassida irrorata Weise, 1898
 Cassida isarogensis Borowiec, 2009
 Cassida jacobsoni Spaeth, 1914
 Cassida japana Baly, 1874
 Cassida javanica (Boheman, 1855)
 Cassida johnsoni Borowiec, 1988
 Cassida juglans Gressitt, 1942
 Cassida justa Spaeth, 1914
 Cassida kinabaluensis Borowiec, 1999
 Cassida koreana Borowiec & Cho, 2011
 Cassida kunminica (Chen & Zia, 1964)
 Cassida labiatophaga Medvedev & Eroshkina, 1988
 Cassida lacrymosa Boheman, 1854
 Cassida laetabilis Spaeth, 1915
 Cassida laetifica Weise, 1910
 Cassida langeri Borowiec, 2009
 Cassida laotica Borowiec, 2002
 Cassida latecincta Fairmaire, 1904
 Cassida lateritia Fairmaire, 1904
 Cassida leucanthemi Bordy, 1995
 Cassida limpopoana Borowiec & Swietojanska, 2001
 Cassida lineola Creutzer, 1799
 Cassida linnavuorii Borowiec, 1986
 Cassida liquefacta Spaeth, 1912
 Cassida litigiosa Boheman, 1854
 Cassida lombocensis (Spaeth, 1919)
 Cassida lueboensis Spaeth, 1932
 Cassida luxuriosa Spaeth, 1940
 Cassida luzonica Spaeth, 1933
 Cassida lycii Borowiec & Swietojanska, 2001
 Cassida lyrica Fairmaire, 1904
 Cassida madagascarica Borowiec, 1999
 Cassida magilensis Spaeth, 1926
 Cassida major Kraatz, 1874
 Cassida malaysiana Borowiec, 2010
 Cassida mandli Spaeth, 1921
 Cassida manipuria Maulik, 1923
 Cassida margaritacea Schaller, 1783
 Cassida mariaeadelheidae Spaeth, 1915
 Cassida mashonensis Spaeth, 1928
 Cassida medvedevi Lopatin, 1965
 Cassida melanophthalma Boheman, 1854
 Cassida mera Germar, 1848
 Cassida mindanaoensis Spaeth, 1933
 Cassida mishmiensis Sekerka & Borowiec, 2008
 Cassida mongolica Boheman, 1854
 Cassida montana Borowiec, 1999
 Cassida monticola Borowiec, 1988
 Cassida moori Boheman, 1856
 Cassida morondaviana Borowiec, 2007
 Cassida mroczkowskii Borowiec & Swietojanska, 1997
 Cassida murraea Linnaeus, 1767
 Cassida mysorensis Borowiec & Swietojanska, 1996
 Cassida namibiensis Borowiec, 2005
 Cassida natalensis Spaeth, 1932
 Cassida navicella Boheman, 1862
 Cassida nebulosa Linnaeus, 1758
 Cassida nepalica Medvedev, 1977
 Cassida nigriventris Boheman, 1854
 Cassida nigrocastanea (Chen & Zia, 1964)
 Cassida nigrodentata Medvedev & Eroshkina, 1988
 Cassida nigroflavens Borowiec, 1988
 Cassida nigrogibbosa Spaeth, 1901
 Cassida nigrohumeralis Borowiec & Ghate, 2004
 Cassida nigroramosa (Chen & Zia, 1964)
 Cassida nigroscutata Fairmaire, 1904
 Cassida nilgirica Spaeth, 1914
 Cassida nobilis Linnæus, 1758
 Cassida nucula Spaeth, 1914
 Cassida nuwara Maulik, 1919
 Cassida nysea Spaeth, 1926
 Cassida obenbergeri (Spaeth, 1928)
 Cassida oberlaenderi Spaeth, 1916
 Cassida obtusata Boheman, 1854
 Cassida occursans Spaeth, 1914
 Cassida olympica Sekerka, 2005
 Cassida ovalis Spaeth, 1914
 Cassida pacholatkoi Sekerka & Borowiec, 2008
 Cassida pagana (Boheman, 1855)
 Cassida paiensis Borowiec, 2001
 Cassida palaestina Reiche, 1858
 Cassida paliji Matis, 1970
 Cassida pallidicollis Boheman, 1856
 Cassida pannonica Suffrian, 1844
 Cassida panzeri Weise, 1907
 Cassida parvula Boheman, 1854
 Cassida patruelis Spaeth, 1935
 Cassida pauliani Borowiec, 1999
 Cassida pauxilla Boheman, 1854
 Cassida pellegrini Marseul, 1868
 Cassida penelope Boheman, 1862
 Cassida pernix Spaeth, 1917
 Cassida perplexa (Chen & Zia, 1961)
 Cassida persica Spaeth, 1926
 Cassida persicana Borowiec, 1999
 Cassida pfefferi Sekerka, 2006
 Cassida physodes (Boheman, 1855)
 Cassida piperata Hope, 1842
 Cassida plausibilis (Boheman, 1862)
 Cassida plicatula Fairmaire, 1904
 Cassida polymeriae Borowiec & Burwell, 2011
 Cassida postarcuata (Chen & Zia, 1964)
 Cassida praensis Borowiec, 2001
 Cassida prasina Illiger, 1798
 Cassida pretiosa Borowiec, 1988
 Cassida probata Spaeth, 1914
 Cassida procurva Spaeth, 1924
 Cassida propitia Boheman, 1862
 Cassida prospera Spaeth, 1915
 Cassida pseudosyrtica Medvedev & Eroshkina, 1988
 Cassida pubescens Spaeth, 1905
 Cassida pubipennis Borowiec, 1999
 Cassida pudens Boheman, 1854
 Cassida pulpa Spaeth, 1915
 Cassida pulvinata Boheman, 1854
 Cassida purpuricollis (Spaeth, 1914)
 Cassida pusilla Waltl, 1839
 Cassida pusio Spaeth, 1915
 Cassida pyrenaea Weise, 1893
 Cassida quadricolorata Borowiec, 1999
 Cassida quadriramosa Gressitt, 1952
 Cassida quatuordecimsignata Spaeth, 1899
 Cassida queenslandica Borowiec, 2006
 Cassida quinaria (Chen & Zia, 1964)
 Cassida quinquemaculata Boheman, 1854
 Cassida rati Maulik, 1923
 Cassida ratina (Chen & Zia, 1964)
 Cassida recondita (Boheman, 1862)
 Cassida reitteri Weise, 1892
 Cassida relicta Spaeth, 1927
 Cassida reticulicosta (Chen & Zia, 1964)
 Cassida reticulipennis Borowiec & Swietojanska, 2001
 Cassida rhodesiaca Spaeth, 1928
 Cassida ribbei (Spaeth, 1919)
 Cassida rimosa (Boheman, 1854)
 Cassida rothschildi Spaeth, 1922
 Cassida rubiginosa Müller, 1776  (thistle tortoise beetle)
 Cassida rubripennis Borowiec, 2002
 Cassida rubromaculata Spaeth, 1918
 Cassida rubroornata (Boheman, 1855)
 Cassida rudicollis (Spaeth, 1915)
 Cassida rufomicans Fairmaire, 1904
 Cassida rufovirens Suffrian, 1844
 Cassida rugipennis (Boheman, 1855)
 Cassida ruralis (Boheman, 1862)
 Cassida sabahensis Swietojanska & Borowiec, 2002
 Cassida saginata Spaeth, 1914
 Cassida samangana (Spaeth, 1919)
 Cassida sanguineoguttata Spaeth, 1915
 Cassida sanguinicollis (Spaeth, 1926)
 Cassida sanguinolenta Müller, 1776
 Cassida sanguinosa Suffrian, 1844
 Cassida sappho (Boheman, 1862)
 Cassida sareptana Kraatz, 1873
 Cassida saucia Weise, 1889
 Cassida sauteri (Spaeth, 1913)
 Cassida schawalleri Medvedev, 1990
 Cassida schenklingi (Spaeth, 1915)
 Cassida schoutedeni Spaeth, 1932
 Cassida scymnoides Borowiec, 1999
 Cassida seladonia Gyllenhal, 1827
 Cassida semipunctata Chen & Zia, 1964
 Cassida senicula (Spaeth, 1915)
 Cassida seniculoides Borowiec, 1999
 Cassida septemdecimpunctata (Boheman, 1855)
 Cassida seraphina Ménétries, 1836
 Cassida sexguttata Boisduval, 1835
 Cassida sigillata (Gorham, 1885)
 Cassida signifera Weise, 1905
 Cassida silvicola Borowiec, 1998
 Cassida simanica (Chen & Zia, 1961)
 Cassida smaragdocruciata Medvedev & Eroshkina, 1982
 Cassida socialis Spaeth, 1926
 Cassida sodalis (Chen & Zia, 1964)
 Cassida solida Spaeth, 1940
 Cassida somalica Spaeth, 1941
 Cassida spaethi Weise, 1900
 Cassida spaethiana Gressitt, 1952
 Cassida spartea Shaw, 1961
 Cassida spatiosa Spaeth, 1928
 Cassida sphaerula Boheman, 1854
 Cassida spissa Weise, 1897
 Cassida stevensi Sekerka, 2011
 Cassida stigmatica Suffrian, 1844
 Cassida strejceki Sekerka, 2006
 Cassida strigaticollis Borowiec, 1988
 Cassida strumosa (Spaeth, 1915)
 Cassida stupa Maulik, 1919
 Cassida suaveola (Spaeth, 1915)
 Cassida subacuticollis Borowiec, 1999
 Cassida sublesta (Weise, 1904)
 Cassida subprobata (Chen & Zia, 1964)
 Cassida subreticulata Suffrian, 1844
 Cassida subtilis Weise, 1897
 Cassida successiva Spaeth, 1924
 Cassida sulphurago Boheman, 1854
 Cassida sulphurea Boheman, 1854
 Cassida sussamyrica Spaeth, 1926
 Cassida syrtica Boheman, 1856
 Cassida taediosa Boheman, 1856
 Cassida tarda Weise, 1899
 Cassida tenasserimensis Spaeth, 1926
 Cassida tenax Spaeth, 1915
 Cassida tenuicula Boheman, 1856
 Cassida thailandica Borowiec, 2001
 Cassida thomsoni Boheman, 1862
 Cassida tianshanica Borowiec & Swietojanska, 2001
 Cassida timefacta Boheman, 1856
 Cassida timorensis Borowiec, 1995
 Cassida tosta Klug, 1835
 Cassida transcaucasica Borowiec & Swietojanska, 2001
 Cassida trepidula Spaeth, 1932
 Cassida triangulum (Weise, 1897)
 Cassida troglodytes Boheman, 1854
 Cassida trossula Spaeth, 1915
 Cassida truncatipennis (Spaeth, 1914)
 Cassida tsaratanana Borowiec, 1988
 Cassida tsinlinica Chen & Zia, 1964
 Cassida tuberculata Medvedev & Eroshkina, 1988
 Cassida tumidicollis (Chen & Zia, 1961)
 Cassida turcmenica Weise, 1892
 Cassida umbonata Borowiec, 1999
 Cassida undecimnotata Gebler, 1841
 Cassida unica Swietojanska & Borowiec, 2002
 Cassida unicatenata (Weise, 1910)
 Cassida unimaculata Boheman, 1854
 Cassida uniorbis (Chen & Zia, 1961)
 Cassida vafra Boheman, 1862
 Cassida variabilis (Chen & Zia, 1961)
 Cassida varians Herbst, 1799
 Cassida varicornis (Spaeth, 1912)
 Cassida velaris Weise, 1896
 Cassida verrucata (Boheman, 1855)
 Cassida versicolor (Boheman, 1855)
 Cassida vesicularis Thunberg, 1787
 Cassida vespertilio Boheman, 1862
 Cassida vespertina Boheman, 1862
 Cassida vibex Linnaeus, 1767
 Cassida vicinalis (Spaeth, 1915)
 Cassida vietnamica Medvedev & Eroshkina, 1988
 Cassida virguncula Weise, 1889
 Cassida viridiguttata (Chen & Zia, 1964)
 Cassida viridinotata (Boheman, 1855)
 Cassida viridipennis Boheman, 1854
 Cassida viridis Linnæus, 1758
 Cassida vitalisi (Spaeth, 1928)
 Cassida vittata Villiers, 1789
 Cassida weinmanni Chapuis, 1880
 Cassida weisei (Jacobson, 1894)
 † Cassida blancheti Heer, 1856
 † Cassida dufouri Piton, 1936
 † Cassida hermione Heer, 1847
 † Cassida interemta von Heyden, 1862
 † Cassida kramstae Förster, 1891
 † Cassida megapenthes Heer, 1847

References

Cassida